The Video Reality is a game engine developed by SouthPeak Games for Graphic adventure games between 1997 and 2000.

The first title utilizing Video Reality was Temujin: The Capricorn Collection, a psychological thriller that started selling in September 1997. The second title utilizing Video Reality was Dark Side of the Moon: A Sci-Fi Adventure and the third and last title utilizing Video Reality was 20,000 Leagues: The Adventure Continues, which was never released to the public

SouthPeak Games shut down their studios in 2000 and with the studio closing Video Reality full-motion engine was discontinued as well. SouthPeak Games is currently a video game publisher of titles in Europe and North America.

Features
- 360', Wide-screen navigation through filmed sets and pre-rendered 3D environments.- Full screen conversation and dramatic sequences.- Conversation mode allows players to interact with the game's characters and allows for multiple story endings.- Sophisticated puzzles built into the storyline challenge the player's intellect and skills.- Thousands of possible paths in six unique environments intensify both drama and suspense.- Intuitive, user-friendly, point-and-click interface.

Games using the Video Reality engine
 1997 - Temüjin: A Supernatural Adventure
 1998 - Dark Side of the Moon: A Sci-Fi Adventure
 2000 - 20,000 Leagues: The Adventure Continues

External links

 

Video game engines